Robert Anthony Taylor (born 30 April 1971) is an English former professional footballer, licensed football agent and manager who is in charge of Watton United.

As a player he was a forward and was active as a professional between 1990 and 2003. Although featuring for Wolverhampton Wanderers and Manchester City, he notably had lengthy and prolific spells with Leyton Orient, Brentford and Gillingham. He notably scored for the Gills at Wembley Stadium in the 1999 Division Two Play-off final against Manchester City, only months before he would join The Blues. Taylor also played professionally for Norwich City, Birmingham City, Queens Park Rangers, Grimsby Town and Scunthorpe United. He retired in 2003 following a brief spell with Non-League side Gorleston, although whilst manager of Diss Town he did make three more senior appearances between 2008 and 2012. Since retiring Taylor has managed at Non-League level for Watton United, King's Lynn Town, Dereham Town, Diss Town, Mundford, Swaffham Town and Acle United.

Playing career 
Born in Norwich, Taylor played for Watton United's youth team. He was first spotted after playing for Watton United's first team at the age of 15 against Norwich City's reserves in a pre-season friendly.

A forward, Taylor failed to make a first-team appearance for Norwich, making his professional debut in 1991 whilst on loan at Leyton Orient. He spent August and September 1990 with Norwegian side Mjølner to gain further experience. He played five games and scored one goal for Mjølner in the second tier of the Norwegian league during a loan spell that lasted until the end of the season in Norway.

In 1991 Taylor signed for Birmingham City where he also failed to make the first team. He then signed permanently former loan club Leyton Orient where he scored 20 goals in 81 appearances, before moving to Brentford where he scored 74 goals in 208 appearances.

In 1998, he signed for Gillingham for a then club-record fee of £500,000. Playing under manager Tony Pulis Taylor enjoyed the best goal scoring run of his career, totalling 39 goals in 70 games. This included 5 goals away in a single game, away to Burnley in February 1999. Taylor played and scored in the 1999 Second Division play-off Final against Manchester City.

Taylor remained with the club until November 1999 when he signed for Manchester City for £1.5 million. Playing for the club as it gained promotion from the First Division, he scored 5 goals in 12 appearances.

In 2000, he signed for Wolverhampton Wanderers for £1.55 million on a four-year deal, commenting that City's signings of Paolo Wanchope and George Weah meant his playing time would be limited at the club. He only made 12 first team appearances for Wolves, scoring three goals and suffered with then-undiagnosed circulatory problems in his legs. Whilst at the club he was sent on loan to Queens Park Rangers, Grimsby Town and his former club Gillingham.

Leaving Wolves in 2002 he then signed permanently for Grimsby Town, before ending his professional career with Scunthorpe United.

He also went on to play for non-League club Gorleston. In 2008, while Diss Town manager, he made a brief playing comeback early in the 2008–09 season.

Managerial career 
Taylor moved into management with Watton United, King's Lynn (as caretaker manager), Dereham Town, Diss Town, Mundford and more recently Swaffham Town.

In 2019 he returned to Watton United as manager.

Personal life 
As a child Taylor supported Liverpool, citing Kenny Dalglish and Ian Rush as his inspiration.

In 2016 Taylor launched a football agency, TG-Inspire.

Career statistics

Honours

As a player 
Manchester City
 Football League First Division runner-up: 1999-00
Individual

 Brentford Player of the Season: 1995–96
 Gillingham Player of the Season: 1998–99

As a manager 
Diss Town
 Eastern Counties League First Division third-place promotion: 2010–11

References

External links
Profile at ex-canaries.co.uk

Chester City Profile

1971 births
Living people
Footballers from Norwich
English footballers
Norwich City F.C. players
Leyton Orient F.C. players
Birmingham City F.C. players
Brentford F.C. players
Gillingham F.C. players
Manchester City F.C. players
Wolverhampton Wanderers F.C. players
Queens Park Rangers F.C. players
Grimsby Town F.C. players
Scunthorpe United F.C. players
Gorleston F.C. players
Association football forwards
English Football League players
English football managers
Watton United F.C. managers
King's Lynn F.C. managers
Dereham Town F.C. managers
Diss Town F.C. managers
Swaffham Town F.C. managers
Expatriate footballers in Norway